Chamaecyparis obtusa (Japanese cypress, hinoki cypress or hinoki;  or) is a species of cypress native to central Japan in East Asia, and widely cultivated in the temperate northern hemisphere for its high-quality timber and ornamental qualities, with many cultivars commercially available.

Description 
The bark is dark red-brown. The cones are globose,  in diameter, with 8–12 scales arranged in opposite pairs.

Related species 
The plant is widespread in Japan. The related Chamaecyparis pisifera (sawara cypress) can be readily distinguished in its having pointed tips to the leaves and smaller cones. A similar cypress found on Taiwan is treated by different botanists as either a variety of this species (as Chamaecyparis obtusa var. formosana) or as a separate species Chamaecyparis taiwanensis; it differs in having smaller cones (6–9 mm diameter) with smaller scales, and leaves with a more acute apex.

Timber 
It is grown for its very high-quality timber in Japan, where it is used as a material for building palaces, temples, shrines, traditional noh theatres, baths, table tennis blades and masu. The wood is lemon-scented, light pinkish-brown, with a rich, straight grain, and is highly rot-resistant. For example, Horyuji Temple and Osaka Castle are built from hinoki wood. The hinoki grown in Kiso, used for building Ise Shrine, are called 御神木 go-shin-boku, or "divine trees".

Ornamental cultivation 
It is also a popular ornamental tree in parks and gardens, both in Japan and elsewhere in temperate climates, including western Europe and parts of North America. A large number of cultivars have been selected for garden planting, including dwarf forms, forms with yellow leaves, and forms with congested foliage. It is also often grown as bonsai.

Cultivars 
A few of the best known are listed below. Those marked  have gained the Royal Horticultural Society's Award of Garden Merit (confirmed 2017).
 'Fernspray Gold' – , arching sprays of green/yellow branches
 'Minima' – under  after 20 years with mid-green foliage
 'Nana' – dark green, rounded dwarf shrub to 
 'Nana Aurea' – , golden tips to the fans and a bronze tone in winter
 'Nana Lutea' – compact, slow-growing, golden yellow selection which has become very popular; yellow counterpart to 'Nana gracilis'
 'Spiralis' is an erect, stiff dwarf tree
 'Tsatsumi Gold' – , contorted branches, yellow-green foliage

Chemistry 
The lignans chamaecypanones A and B, obtulignolide, and isootobanone can be found in the heartwood of Chamaecyparis obtusa var. formosana. The biflavones sciadopitysin, ginkgetin, isoginkgetin, podocarpusflavone B, 7,7''-O-dimethylamentoflavone, bilobetin, podocarpusflavone A, 7-O-methylamentoflavone, amentoflavone, hinokinin and hinokiflavone have been confirmed in the leaves of the plant. Chamaecydin was first discovered in the seeds of C. obtusa. The essential oil of Chamaecyparis obtusa contains a wide range of chemical compounds, including but not limited to the following: sabinene, elemol, myrcene, limonene, terpinen-4-ol, eudesmols, α-terpinyl acetate, α-terpinolene, α-terpineol, 3-carene, α-pinene, γ-terpinene, camphene, bornyl acetate, 1-methyladamantane, cuminol, eucarvone, 2-cyclopenten-1-one, 3,4-dimethyl-, 1,3-dimethyl-1-cyclohexene, calamenene, τ-muurolol, borneol, α-cadinol, β-thujaplicin. Some of these compounds are fragrances or intermediates used in the fragrance industry. Thus, the C. obtusa essential oil is used in perfumery and personal care products, such as soaps, shampoos, cosmetics. Hinoki wood is used as a traditional Japanese stick incense for its light, earthy aroma.

Essential oil distilled from its wood is uniquely scented and highly valued.

Pollen 
Hinoki pollen can cause pollinosis, a specific type of allergic rhinitis. Chamaecyparis obtusa, along with Cryptomeria japonica (sugi, Japanese cedar), is the leading source of allergic pollen in Japan and a major cause of hay fever in Japan.

Gallery

References

External links 

obtusa
Endemic flora of Japan
Five sacred trees of Kiso
Garden plants of Asia
Near threatened flora of Asia
Ornamental trees
Plants used in bonsai
Trees of Japan